Plutonium-241 (241Pu or Pu-241) is an isotope of plutonium formed when plutonium-240 captures a neutron. Like some other plutonium isotopes (especially 239Pu), 241Pu is fissile, with a neutron absorption cross section about one-third greater than that of 239Pu, and a similar probability of fissioning on neutron absorption, around 73%. In the non-fission case, neutron capture produces plutonium-242. In general, isotopes with an odd number of neutrons are both more likely to absorb a neutron, and more likely to undergo fission on neutron absorption, than isotopes with an even number of neutrons.

Decay to americium

241Pu has a half-life of 14 years, corresponding to a decay of about 5% of 241Pu nuclei over a one-year period. The longer spent nuclear fuel waits before reprocessing, the more 241Pu decays to americium-241, which is nonfissile (although fissionable by fast neutrons) and an alpha emitter with a half-life of 432 years; 241Am is a major contributor to the radioactivity of nuclear waste on a scale of hundreds or thousands of years.

Americium has lower valence and lower electronegativity than plutonium, neptunium or uranium, so in most nuclear reprocessing, Am tends to fractionate not with  U, Np, or Pu, but with the alkaline fission products: lanthanides, strontium, caesium, barium, yttrium, and is therefore not recycled into nuclear fuel unless special efforts are made.

In a thermal reactor, 241Am captures a neutron to become americium-242, which quickly becomes curium-242 (or, 17.3% of the time, 242Pu) via beta decay. Both 242Cm and 242Pu are much less likely to absorb a neutron, and even less likely to fission; however, 242Cm is short-lived (half-life 160 days) and almost always undergoes alpha decay to 238Pu rather than capturing another neutron. In short, 241Am needs to absorb two neutrons before again becoming a fissile isotope.

References

Actinides
Isotopes of plutonium
Fissile materials